Parasitic castration is the strategy, by a parasite, of blocking reproduction by its host, completely or in part, to its own benefit. This is one of six major strategies within parasitism.

Evolutionary strategy 

The parasitic castration strategy, which results in the reproductive death of the host, can be compared with the parasitoid strategy, which results in the host's death. Both parasitoids and parasitic castrators tend to be similar to their host in size, whereas most non-castrating parasites are orders of magnitude smaller than the host. In both strategies, an infected host is much less hospitable to new parasites than an uninfected one.

A parasite that ends the reproductive life of its host theoretically liberates a significant fraction of the host's resources, which can now be used to benefit the parasite. The fraction of intact host energy spent on reproduction includes not just gonads and gametes but also secondary sexual characteristics, mate-seeking behavior, competition, and care for offspring. Infected hosts may have a different appearance, lacking said sex characteristics and sometimes even devoting more energy to growth, resulting in gigantism. The evolutionary parasitologist Robert Poulin suggests that parasitic castration may result in prolonged host life, benefiting the parasite.

Parasitic castration may be direct, as in Hemioniscus balani, a parasite of hermaphroditic barnacles which feeds on ovarian fluid, so that its host loses female reproductive ability but still can function as a male. 
Parasitic castration may equally be indirect, as when a parasite diverts host energy from developing gonads, or secretes castrating hormones. 

The parasitic castration strategy is used by some larval trematode parasites of snails and some isopod and barnacle parasites of crustaceans. For example, 18 species of trematodes parasitically castrate the California horn snail, Cerithidea californica.

Certain other effects of a parasite on its host may appear similar to parasitic castration, such as the host's immune system diverting energy from reproduction in response to numerous parasites that singly would have no impact on fecundity or fertility, or parasitoids that may consume reproductive organs first.

Taxonomic range

References

Parasitology